This is a list of current Major League Soccer players who have been capped at least once by their respective national team's first squad. Only national teams that are full members of FIFA are listed.

Listed by MLS team

Atlanta United FC
  Luis Abram
  Thiago Almada
  Osvaldo Alonso
  Machop Chol
  Clément Diop
  Derrick Etienne
  Giorgos Giakoumakis
  Brad Guzan
  Ronald Hernández
  Brooks Lennon
  Miles Robinson

Austin FC
  Will Bruin
  Julio Cascante
  Ethan Finlay
  Nick Lima
  Adam Lundqvist
  Emiliano Rigoni
  Alexander Ring
  Amro Tarek
  Leo Väisänen
  Gyasi Zardes

Charlotte FC
  Harrison Afful
  Kamil Jóźwiak
  Joseph Mora
  Karol Świderski
  Bill Tuiloma

Chicago Fire
   Gastón Giménez
  Kei Kamara
  Chris Mueller
  Miguel Navarro
  Xherdan Shaqiri
  Jairo Torres

FC Cincinnati
  Marco Angulo
  Santiago Arias
  Yuya Kubo
  Matt Miazga
  Júnior Moreno
  Arquimides Ordóñez
  Alvas Powell
  Brandon Vazquez
  Kenneth Vermeer

Colorado Rapids
  Bryan Acosta
  Cole Bassett
  Steven Beitashour
  Alex Gersbach
  Marko Ilić
  Jonathan Lewis
  Andreas Maxsø
  Diego Rubio

  Danny Wilson
  William Yarbrough

Columbus Crew
  Miloš Degenek
  Luis Díaz
  Cucho Hernández
  Kevin Molino
  Aidan Morris
  Darlington Nagbe
  Christian Ramirez
  Eloy Room
  Gustavo Vallecilla
  Yaw Yeboah
  Lucas Zelarayán

D.C. United
  Christian Benteke
  Steve Birnbaum
  Alex Bono
  Taxiarchis Fountas
  Jeremy Garay
  Mohanad Jeahze
  Ola Kamara
  Mateusz Klich
  Ravel Morrison
  Andy Najar
  Victor Pálsson
  Donovan Pines
  Martín Rodríguez
  Derrick Williams

FC Dallas
  Paul Arriola
  Marco Farfan
  Jesús Ferreira
  Sebastian Lletget
  Paxton Pomykal

Houston Dynamo
  Corey Baird
  Adalberto Carrasquilla
  Sebastián Ferreira
  Iván Franco
  Teenage Hadebe
  Héctor Herrera

  Brad Smith

Inter Miami CF
  Edison Azcona
  Shanyder Borgelin
  Leonardo Campana
  Serhiy Kryvtsov
  Ariel Lassiter
  Aimé Mabika
  Josef Martínez
  Rodolfo Pizarro
  Robert Taylor
  DeAndre Yedlin

LA Galaxy
  Efraín Álvarez
   Tyler Boyd
  Martín Cáceres
  Douglas Costa
  Mark Delgado
  Raheem Edwards
  Chase Gasper
  Javier Hernández
  Dejan Joveljić
  Kelvin Leerdam
  Chris Mavinga
  Jalen Neal
  Eriq Zavaleta

Los Angeles FC
  Kellyn Acosta
  Denis Bouanga
  Giorgio Chiellini
  José Cifuentes
  Maxime Crépeau
  Eldin Jakupović
  Aaron Long
  Denil Maldonado
  Diego Palacios
  Carlos Vela

Minnesota United FC
  Luis Amarilla
  Kervin Arriaga
  Michael Boxall
  Bakaye Dibassy
  Doneil Henry
  Bongokuhle Hlongwane
  Kemar Lawrence
  Robin Lod
  Joseph Rosales
  Dayne St. Clair
  Wil Trapp
  Zarek Valentin

CF Montreal
  Zachary Brault-Guillard
  Aaron Herrera
  Sunusi Ibrahim
  Lassi Lappalainen
  Kamal Miller
  Samuel Piette
  Romell Quioto
  Róbert Orri Þorkelsson
  Victor Wanyama
  Joel Waterman

Nashville SC
  Teal Bunbury
  Aníbal Godoy
  Randall Leal
  Daniel Lovitz
  Dax McCarty
  Shaq Moore
  Fafà Picault
  C. J. Sapong
  Jacob Shaffelburg
  Walker Zimmerman

New England Revolution
  Jozy Altidore
  Dylan Borrero
  Omar Gonzalez
  DeJuan Jones
  Henry Kessler
  Christian Makoun
  Đorđe Petrović
  Matt Polster
  Giacomo Vrioni
  Bobby Wood

New York City FC
  Maxime Chanot
  Alfredo Morales
  Keaton Parks
  James Sands

New York Red Bulls
  Cory Burke
  Cristian Cásseres
  Kyle Duncan
  Lewis Morgan
  Steven Sserwadda
  John Tolkin
  Dante Vanzeir

Orlando City SC
  Wilder Cartagena
  Pedro Gallese
  Robin Jansson
  Ercan Kara
  Wilfredo Rivera
  Dagur Dan Þórhallsson
  Facundo Torres

Philadelphia Union
  Alejandro Bedoya
  Andre Blake
  Dániel Gazdag
  Damion Lowe
  José Martínez
  Olivier Mbaizo
  Richard Odada
  Andrés Perea
  Mikael Uhre

Portland Timbers
  David Bingham
  Sebastián Blanco
  Diego Chará
  Yimmi Chará
  Marvin Loría
  Larrys Mabiala
  Felipe Mora
  Santiago Moreno
  Juan David Mosquera
  Cristhian Paredes
  Eryk Williamson

Real Salt Lake
  Maikel Chang
  Justin Meram
  Braian Ojeda
  Bryan Oviedo
   Rubio Rubin
  Jefferson Savarino

San Jose Earthquakes
  Ousseni Bouda
  Cade Cowell
  Jeremy Ebobisse
  Carlos Gruezo
  Jonathan Mensah
  Jamiro Monteiro
  Miguel Trauco
  Jackson Yueill

Seattle Sounders FC
  Xavier Arreaga
  Yeimar Gómez
  Nicolás Lodeiro
  Fredy Montero
  Jordan Morris
  Alex Roldán
  Cristian Roldan
  Kelyn Rowe
  Raúl Ruidíaz
  Albert Rusnák
  Nouhou Tolo

Sporting Kansas City
  Roger Espinoza
  Gadi Kinda
  Alan Pulido
  Nemanja Radoja
  Johnny Russell
  Dániel Sallói
  Ben Sweat
  Marinos Tzionis
  Graham Zusi

St. Louis City SC
  Njabulo Blom
  Roman Bürki
  Nicholas Gioacchini
  Joakim Nilsson
  Tim Parker
  Selmir Pidro

Toronto FC
   Ayo Akinola
  Federico Bernardeschi
  Michael Bradley
  Adama Diomande
  Matt Hedges
  Lorenzo Insigne
  Sean Johnson
  Mark-Anthony Kaye
  Richie Laryea
  Jonathan Osorio
  Greg Ranjitsingh
  Tomas Romero
  Sigurd Rosted
  Brandon Servania

Vancouver Whitecaps FC
  Javain Brown
  Sergio Córdova
  Andrés Cubas
  Julian Gressel
  Alessandro Schöpf
  Russell Teibert
  Ranko Veselinović

Listed by national team

Albania
 Giacomo Vrioni

Argentina
 Thiago Almada
 Sebastián Blanco
 Gastón Giménez
 Emiliano Rigoni

Armenia
 Lucas Zelarayán

Australia
 Miloš Degenek
 Alex Gersbach
 Brad Smith

Austria
 Ercan Kara
 Alessandro Schöpf

Belgium
 Christian Benteke
 Dante Vanzeir

Bosnia and Herzegovina
 Selmir Pidro

Brazil
 Douglas Costa

Burkina Faso
 Ousseni Bouda

Cameroon
 Olivier Mbaizo
 Nouhou Tolo

Canada
 Ayo Akinola
 Zachary Brault-Guillard
 Maxime Crépeau
 Raheem Edwards
 Doneil Henry
 Mark-Anthony Kaye
 Richie Laryea
 Kamal Miller
 Jonathan Osorio
 Samuel Piette
 Jacob Shaffelburg
 Dayne St. Clair
 Russell Teibert
 Joel Waterman

Cape Verde
 Jamiro Monteiro

Chile
 Felipe Mora
 Martín Rodríguez
 Diego Rubio

Colombia
 Santiago Arias
 Dylan Borrero
 Diego Chará
 Yimmi Chará
 Yeimar Gómez
 Cucho Hernández
 Fredy Montero
 Santiago Moreno
 Juan David Mosquera

Costa Rica
 Julio Cascante
 Luis Díaz
 Ariel Lassiter
 Randall Leal
 Marvin Loría
 Joseph Mora
 Bryan Oviedo

Cuba
 Osvaldo Alonso
 Maikel Chang

Curaçao
 Eloy Room

Cyprus
 Marinos Tzionis

Denmark
 Andreas Maxsø
 Mikael Uhre

Dominican Republic
 Edison Azcona

DR Congo
 Larrys Mabiala
 Chris Mavinga

Ecuador
 Marco Angulo
 Xavier Arreaga
 Leonardo Campana
 José Cifuentes
 Carlos Gruezo
 Diego Palacios
 Gustavo Vallecilla

Egypt
 Amro Tarek

El Salvador
 Jeremy Garay

 Alex Roldán
 Tomas Romero
 Eriq Zavaleta

Finland
 Lassi Lappalainen
 Robin Lod
 Alexander Ring
 Robert Taylor
 Leo Väisänen

Gabon
 Denis Bouanga

Ghana
 Harrison Afful
 Jonathan Mensah

Greece
 Taxiarchis Fountas
 Giorgos Giakoumakis

Guatemala
 Arquimides Ordóñez
 Rubio Rubin

Haiti
 Shanyder Borgelin
 Derrick Etienne

Honduras
 Bryan Acosta
 Kervin Arriaga
 Roger Espinoza
 Denil Maldonado
 Andy Najar
 Romell Quioto
 Joseph Rosales

Hungary
 Dániel Gazdag
 Dániel Sallói

Iceland
 Victor Pálsson
 Dagur Dan Þórhallsson
 Róbert Orri Þorkelsson

Iran
 Steven Beitashour

Iraq
 Mohanad Jeahze
 Justin Meram

Israel 
 Gadi Kinda

Republic of Ireland
 Derrick Williams

Italy
 Federico Bernardeschi
 Giorgio Chiellini
 Lorenzo Insigne

Japan
 Yuya Kubo

Jamaica
 Andre Blake
 Javain Brown
 Cory Burke
 Kemar Lawrence
 Damion Lowe
 Ravel Morrison
 Alvas Powell

Kenya
 Richard Odada
 Victor Wanyama

Luxembourg
 Maxime Chanot

Mali
 Bakaye Dibassy

Mexico
 Efraín Álvarez
 Javier Hernández
 Héctor Herrera
 Rodolfo Pizarro
 Alan Pulido
 Jairo Torres
 Carlos Vela

Nigeria
 Sunusi Ibrahim

Netherlands
 Kenneth Vermeer

New Zealand
 Michael Boxall
 Tyler Boyd
 Bill Tuiloma

Norway
 Adama Diomande
 Ola Kamara
 Sigurd Rosted

Panama
 Adalberto Carrasquilla
 Aníbal Godoy

Paraguay
 Luis Amarilla
 Andrés Cubas
 Sebastián Ferreira
 Iván Franco
 Gastón Giménez
 Braian Ojeda
 Cristhian Paredes

Peru
 Luis Abram
 Wilder Cartagena
 Pedro Gallese
 Raúl Ruidíaz
 Miguel Trauco

Poland
 Kamil Jóźwiak
 Mateusz Klich
 Karol Świderski

Puerto Rico
 Wilfredo Rivera
 Zarek Valentin

Scotland
 Lewis Morgan
 Johnny Russell
 Danny Wilson

Senegal
 Clément Diop

Serbia
 Marko Ilić
 Dejan Joveljić
 Đorđe Petrović
 Nemanja Radoja
 Ranko Veselinović

Sierra Leone
 Kei Kamara

Slovakia
 Albert Rusnák

South Africa
 Njabulo Blom
 Bongokuhle Hlongwane

South Sudan
 Machop Chol

Suriname
 Kelvin Leerdam

Sweden
 Robin Jansson
 Adam Lundqvist
 Joakim Nilsson

Switzerland
 Roman Bürki
 Eldin Jakupović
 Xherdan Shaqiri

Trinidad and Tobago
 Kevin Molino
 Greg Ranjitsingh

Uganda
 Steven Sserwadda

Ukraine
 Serhiy Kryvtsov

United States
 Kellyn Acosta
 Ayo Akinola
 Jozy Altidore
 Paul Arriola
 Corey Baird
 Cole Bassett
 Alejandro Bedoya
 David Bingham
 Steve Birnbaum
 Alex Bono
 Tyler Boyd
 Michael Bradley
 Will Bruin
 Teal Bunbury
 Cade Cowell
 Mark Delgado
 Kyle Duncan
 Jeremy Ebobisse
 Marco Farfan
 Jesús Ferreira
 Ethan Finlay
 Chase Gasper
 Nicholas Gioacchini
 Omar Gonzalez
 Julian Gressel
 Brad Guzan
 Matt Hedges
 Aaron Herrera
 Sean Johnson
 DeJuan Jones
 Henry Kessler
 Brooks Lennon
 Jonathan Lewis
 Nick Lima
 Sebastian Lletget
 Aaron Long
 Daniel Lovitz
 Dax McCarty
 Matt Miazga
 Shaq Moore
 Alfredo Morales
 Aidan Morris
 Jordan Morris
 Chris Mueller
 Darlington Nagbe
 Jalen Neal
 Tim Parker
 Keaton Parks
 Andrés Perea
 Fafà Picault
 Donovan Pines
 Matt Polster
 Paxton Pomykal
 Christian Ramirez
 Miles Robinson
 Cristian Roldan
 Kelyn Rowe
 Rubio Rubin
 James Sands
 C. J. Sapong
 Brandon Servania
 Ben Sweat
 John Tolkin
 Wil Trapp
 Brandon Vazquez
 Eryk Williamson
 Bobby Wood
 William Yarbrough
 DeAndre Yedlin
 Jackson Yueill
 Gyasi Zardes
 Walker Zimmerman
 Graham Zusi

Uruguay
 Martín Cáceres
 Nicolás Lodeiro
 Facundo Torres

Venezuela
 Cristian Cásseres
 Sergio Córdova
 Ronald Hernández
 Christian Makoun
 José Martínez
 Josef Martínez
 Júnior Moreno
 Miguel Navarro
 Jefferson Savarino

Zambia
 Aimé Mabika

Zimbabwe
 Teenage Hadebe

Current MLS Players to play in a World Cup

2010 FIFA World Cup
  Jonathan Mensah
  Roger Espinoza
  Giorgio Chiellini
  Javier Hernández
  Carlos Vela
  Xherdan Shaqiri
  Jozy Altidore
  Michael Bradley
  Brad Guzan
  Martín Cáceres
  Nicolás Lodeiro

2014 FIFA World Cup
  Santiago Arias
  Carlos Gruezo
  Harrison Afful
  Jonathan Mensah
  Roger Espinoza
  Andy Najar
  Steven Beitashour
  Giorgio Chiellini
  Lorenzo Insigne
  Javier Hernández
  Héctor Herrera
  Alan Pulido
  Roman Bürki
  Xherdan Shaqiri
  Jozy Altidore
  Alejandro Bedoya
  Michael Bradley
  Omar Gonzalez
  Brad Guzan
  DeAndre Yedlin
  Graham Zusi
  Martín Cáceres
  Nicolás Lodeiro

2018 FIFA World Cup
  Miloš Degenek
  Douglas Costa
  Santiago Arias
  Bryan Oviedo
  Javier Hernández
  Héctor Herrera
  Carlos Vela
  Aníbal Godoy
  Wilder Cartagena
  Pedro Gallese
  Raúl Ruidíaz
  Miguel Trauco
  Roman Bürki
  Xherdan Shaqiri
  Martín Cáceres

2022 FIFA World Cup
  Thiago Almada
  Miloš Degenek
  Olivier Mbaizo
  Nouhou Tolo
  Mark-Anthony Kaye
  Richie Laryea
  Kamal Miller
  Jonathan Osorio
  James Pantemis
  Samuel Piette
  Dayne St. Clair
  Joel Waterman
  Bryan Oviedo
  Xavier Arreaga
  José Cifuentes
  Carlos Gruezo
  Diego Palacios
  Héctor Herrera
  Karol Świderski
  Xherdan Shaqiri
  Kellyn Acosta
  Jesús Ferreira
  Sean Johnson
  Aaron Long
  Shaq Moore
  Jordan Morris
  Cristian Roldan
  DeAndre Yedlin
  Walker Zimmerman
  Martín Cáceres
  Facundo Torres

External links

Major League Soccer players portal

Current MLS players with national team caps
Major League Soccer players with national team caps